Proposition 60A was an amendment of the Constitution of California, enacted in 2004, relating to funds from the sale of government property. It was proposed by the California Legislature and approved by the voters in a referendum held as part of the November 2004 election, by a majority of 73%.

Provisions
The law directed funds collected from the sale of surplus government property toward repaying the $15 billion in bonds authorized by the passage of Proposition 57 in March 2004. The official summary of the proposition reads:

To do this the amendment added to the state constitution Article III, Section 9, stating that

The Summary of Legislative Analyst's Estimate of Net State and Local Government Fiscal Impact predicted "Net savings over the longer term-potentially low. Tens of millions of dollars-from accelerated repayment of existing bonds".

Process of enactment

In 2004 the state legislature proposed a constitutional amendment called Senate Constitutional Amendment 18. This contained provisions relating to both primary elections and funds from the sale of government property. This was to be put to voters as a single measure called Proposition 60. However Californians for an Open Primary challenged the measure as a violation of the rule that ballot propositions must deal with only a single subject. The group wished to have Proposition 60 removed from the ballot. Instead, in Californians for an Open Primary v. Shelley, the Third District Court of Appeals ordered that the proposition be split, so that the provisions relating to government property would become a separate measure, called Proposition 60A.

Senate Constitutional Amendment 18 (which included the provisions that would become Proposition 60A) was approved by the California Assembly by a vote of 55-21 and by the State Senate by a vote of 28–3. On November 2, 2004 it was approved by the electorate with 7,776,374 (73.3%) votes in favor and 2,843,435 (26.7%) against.

References

External links
Full text of Proposition 60A

60A
2004